Pandemis inouei is a moth of the family Tortricidae. It is found on Taiwan.

References

Pandemis
Moths of Taiwan
Moths described in 1968